The S&P 100 Index is a stock market index of United States stocks maintained by Standard & Poor's.

Index options on the S&P 100 are traded with the ticker symbol "OEX". Because of the popularity of these options, investors often refer to the index by its ticker symbol.

The S&P 100, a subset of the S&P 500, includes 101 (because one of its component companies has 2 classes of stock) leading U.S. stocks with exchange-listed options. Constituents of the S&P 100 are selected for sector balance and represent about 67% of the market capitalization of the S&P 500 and almost 54% of the market capitalization of the U.S. equity markets as of December 2020. The stocks in the S&P 100 tend to be the largest and most established companies in the S&P 500.

History
In 1983, the CBOE created the first index options, based on its own index, the CBOE 100.

In 1993, CBOE created the Chicago Board Options Exchange Market Volatility Index (VIX), which was computed based on the price of S&P 100 options (at the time these were by far the most heavily traded index options). Then in 2003, they changed it to be based on the S&P 500.

Record values

Components 
(as of January 27, 2023)

Statistics
The mean free float market capitalization of the S&P 100 is over 3 times that of the S&P 500 ($135 bn vs $40 bn as of January 2017); as such, it is larger than a large-cap index. The "sigma" of companies within the S&P 100 is typically less than that of the S&P 500 and thus the corresponding volatility of the S&P 100 is lower. However, the correlation between the two indices is very high.

Investing
This index is tracked by the exchange-traded fund iShares S&P 100 Index.

Annual returns 
The following table shows the price return of the S&P 100 since 1975:

See also
 S&P Global 100
Russell Top 50 Index

References

External links
 Standard & Poor's page on S&P 100 index
 Yahoo! Finance page for ^OEX

1983 introductions
American stock market indices
0100